Dendrobium agrostophyllum, the buttercup orchid, is an epiphytic or lithophytic orchid in the family Orchidaceae and has a creeping rhizome with well-spaced pseudobulbs. Each pseudobulb has up to twenty grass-like leaves, some of the leaves having flowering stems on the opposite side of the pseudobulb, each raceme with up to ten waxy, fragrant, bright yellow flowers. It grows in wet forest in coast areas of north Queensland, Australia.

Description 
Dendrobium agrostophyllum is an epiphytic or lithophytic herb with creeping rhizomes that have well-spaced pseudobulbs, each with between eight and twenty grass-like leaves. The side lobes are curve upwards and the middle lobe has two ridges on its midline and two forward projecting flanges. Flowering occurs from July to November.

Taxonomy and naming
Dendrobium agrostophyllum was first formally described in 1873 by Ferdinand von Mueller and the description was published in his book Fragmenta phytographiae Australiae.

Distribution and habitat
The buttercup orchid grows on rocks and in moist forest including rainforest between the Mount Windsor National Park and the Paluma Range National Park.

References

agrostophyllum
Orchids of Queensland
Plants described in 1873